This is a list of notable bands/musicians from England, UK.  Bands should be notable and linked to their articles which lists their English origins in the lead.  References should be provided for any new entries on this list.  Bands may be temporarily red-linked (while an article is developed) as long as the reference establishes their notability.

By Alphabet

Abingdon
Radiohead
Accrington 
Diana Vickers
Andover
The Troggs
Anstey 
Molly Smitten-Downes 
Ashby-de-la-Zouch
The Young Knives
Ashford
Oliver Sykes 
Aylesbury
Marillion
Barnsley
The Danse Society
Saxon
The Ward Brothers
Basildon
The Assembly
Depeche Mode
Kunt and the Gang
Yazoo
Basingstoke 
Canterbury
Kingsland Road 
Bath
Goldfrapp
Korgis
Tears for Fears
Propellerheads
Batley
Robert Palmer
Battle
Keane
Beccles
Fearless Vampire Killers
Bedford
Briganté
Don Broco
Tinker Jack
Bedworth
Pete Doherty
Belgravia 
Christopher Lee 
Berwick-Upon-Tweed
Won Mississippi
Bewdley
Becky Hill
Bexhill on Sea
Mumm-Ra
Bexleyheath
Kate Bush
Billericay 
Alison Moyet 
Lauren Platt
Bingley
Marmozets
Birkenhead
Half Man Half Biscuit 
Miles Kane
Birmingham 
Anaal Nathrakh
Apache Indian
Au Pairs
The Beat
Benediction
Black Sabbath
Blakfish
Polly Brown
Charged GBH
Deluka
Dexys Midnight Runners
Duran Duran
Editors
Godflesh
Electric Light Orchestra
The English Beat
Fashion
The Fortunes
Fine Young Cannibals
Jahméne 
Judas Priest
Johnny Foreigner
Laura Mvula
Led Zeppelin
Magnetophone
The Moody Blues
The Move
Musical Youth
Napalm Death
Oceans Ate Alaska
Ocean Colour Scene
Offlicence
The Spencer Davis Group
Spunge
Steel Pulse
The Streets
Superfood
Swim Deep
Toyah
Traffic
The Twang
UB40
Wizzard
Bishop's Stortford 
SuRie
Blackburn 
Grace Davies 
Blackpool
Boston Manor
Jethro Tull 
Bolton
Badly Drawn Boy
Buzzcocks
Cherry Ghost
Kinesis
Bolton-upon-Dearne
The Sherlocks 
Bournemouth
Air Traffic
Electric Wizard
Heart In Hand
Bradford
1919
Tasmin Archer
Blue Roses
The Cult
Kiki Dee
Susan Fassbender
Gareth Gates
Zayn Malik
My Dying Bride
New Model Army
Random Hand
Smokie
Terrorvision
Ti Amo
Kimberley Walsh
White Light Parade
Braintree
Next of Kin
The Prodigy
Missing Andy
Jellicoe
Brentwood
InMe
Brighouse
Embrace
Brighton
Architects
As It Is
Beats International
Black Peaks
Blood Red Shoes
Brakes
British Sea Power
Clearlake
Dead Swans
Electrelane
Frankie Cocozza 
Freemasons
Gnarwolves
High Tyde
Huggy Bear
Johnny Truant
Moulettes
Passenger
Peggy Sue
Rex the Dog
Rizzle Kicks
Royal Blood
Samantha Womack
Squid
Tall Ships
TOY
The Electric Soft Parade
The Ghost of a Thousand
The Go! Team
The Kooks
The Lambrettas
The Levellers
The Pipettes
The Qemists
Brighton and Hove
Conor Maynard 
Bristol
Disorder
Massive Attack
The Blue Aeroplanes
New Rhodes
Portishead
Fuck Buttons
Claytown Troupe
Nik Kershaw
Pinch
Steveless
Turbowolf
Tricky
Bromsgrove 
Michael Ball 
Burnley
Chumbawamba
Burton-upon-Trent
Joe Jackson 
Buxton 
Lucy Spraggan
Camberley
Reuben
Cambridge
Black Country, New Road
The Broken Family Band 
Cavetown
Clean Bandit
Katrina and the Waves 
Mallory Knox
Olivia Newton-John
Camden
N-dubz
Canterbury
Soft Machine
The Wilde Flowers
Caravan
Bodyrockers
Lucy Spraggan
Moose Blood
Yndi halda
Carlisle 
Art
Nicki French 
Spooky Tooth
The V.I.P.'s
Chelmsford
Felix
Jonas Blue
Rat Boy 
Cheltenham
Jim Lockey & The Solemn Sun
Kitty Brucknell 
Cheshire
Johnny and the Semitones
Viola Beach
David Gray
Chester
Mansun
Chichester
Tom Odell
Chinnor
Adam Clayton
Chorley
John Foxx
Clacton-on-Sea
Paul Banks 
Sade 
Colchester
Modern English
Special Duties
Stevi Ritchie 
Corby
Raging Speedhorn
Viking Skull
Cornwall
Thirteen Senses
Haven
Al Hodge
Aphex Twin
Coventry
Bolt Thrower
Cathedral
Clint Mansell
The Enemy
Fun Boy 3
Hazel O'Connor
Jigsaw
The Primitives
The Selecter
The Sorrows
The Specials
Crawley
The Cure
Crosby 
Marcus Collins 
Croydon
Ben Haenow 
Rough Copy
Dagenham 
Sandie Shaw 
Derbyshire
Anti Pasti
Lightyear
LostAlone
The Newcranes
The Struts
Doncaster
Louis Tomlinson
Yungblud
Eastbourne
Toploader
East London 
5 After Midnight
East Tilbury 
Anne-Marie 
Egremont
It Bites
Essex 
Shadows Chasing Ghosts
We Are the Ocean
Exeter
Muncie Girls 
Folkestone
Fast Food Rockers 
Frodsham
Gary Barlow
Glastonbury
Reef
Gloucestershire
EMF
Milk Teeth
Godalming
Genesis
Great Yarmouth
Catherine Wheel
Myleene Class 
Ruth Vincent 
Greenford
The Magic Numbers
Guildford
Fastlane
Shadowkeep
The Stranglers
The Vapors
Hackeny 
Idris Elba 
Halifax
Ed Sheeran
Paradise Lost
Hampshire
Canterbury
Frank Turner
Laura Marling
Rex Orange County
Harrogate
Acid Reign
Blood Youth
The Harrogate Band
Little Angels
Olly Alexander 
Stuart Colman
Sulk
Utah Saints
Wally
Harrow
Honey G 
Ian Dury 
New Device
Hartlepool
Michael Rice 
Sneaker Pimps
Havering 
Imogen Heap 
Helmsley
One Night Only 
Hemel Hempstead
Porcupine Tree
Herefordshire
Ellie Goulding
Mott the Hoople
Hertfordshire
Victoria Beckham
Deep Purple
Frank Carter & The Rattlesnakes
Heights
Lower Than Atlantis
The Shadows
The Subways
The Zombies
Hertford
George Ezra
High Wycombe
Howard Jones
Jack Garratt
Thee Hypnotics
Young Guns
Hitchin
James Bay 
Holmes Chapel
Harry Styles
Hoylake
The Rascals
Huddersfield
Evile
Hull
Patricia Bredin 
The Spiders From Mars
Everything But The Girl
The Housemartins
Kingmaker
The Beautiful South
Fila Brazillia
The Paddingtons
Red Guitars
Scarlet
Throbbing Gristle
Hyde
I Am Kloot
Ilford 
Kathy Kirby 
Ipswich
Basement
Rosalita
Cradle of Filth
Extreme Noise Terror
Isle of Wight
Level 42
Grade 2
Sarah Close
Wet Leg
Coach Party
Plastic Mermaids
Islington 
Helena Bonham Carter
Kendal
Wild Beasts 
Kensington 
Javine Hylton
Paul Hardcastle
Kent
HRVY 
Kate Bush
Matt Terry 
Mimi Webb 
Orbital
Nick Heyward
The Rolling Stones
Sub Focus
King's Lynn
Deaf Havana
Kirkby
China Crisis
Laindon 
Josh James
Lancashire
Joni Fuller
Lancaster
Bondax
How's My Pop
The Lovely Eggs
Leamington Spa
Nizlopi
The Shapes
Sharks
Leeds 
Alt-J
Bonobo
Boyracer
Carolynne Poole 
The Chevin
Chumbawamba
Classically Handsome Brutes
Club Smith
Delta 5
Dinosaur Pile-Up
The Dunwells
Ellen and the Escapades
¡Forward, Russia!
Gang of Four
I Like Trains
Hadouken!
Hawk Eyes
Hood
Jellyfish Kiss
Kaiser Chiefs
To Kill A King
Luke Friend 
Mekons
Mel B
Red Lorry Yellow Lorry
The Edsel Auctioneer
The Hollow Men
The Mission
The Music
The Pale Saints
The Parachute Men
The Pigeon Detectives
Pulled Apart By Horses
The Rose of Avalanche
Scritti Politti
Sigma
The Sisters of Mercy
Soft Cell
The Sunshine Underground
The Utah Saints
The Wedding Present
Vessels
Various Cruelties
Leicester
Blab Happy
The Bomb Party
Chrome Molly
Cornershop
Crazyhead
The Deep Freeze Mice
Delicatessen
Diesel Park West
Easy Life
Engelbert Humperdinck 
Family
Gaye Bykers on Acid
Her Name is Calla
The Hunters Club
ist
Kasabian
Kyte
Maybeshewill
Misterlee
Pacific Ocean Fire
Perfume
Po!
Public Relations Exercise
Prolapse
Ruth's Refrigerator
Sam Bailey 
Showaddywaddy
Volcano The Bear
Yeah Yeah Noh
Leighton Buzzard
Kajagoogoo
The Barron Knights
Littlehampton
Delirious?
Lincoln
The Casuals 
Climates
Lincolnshire
Bram Tchaikovsky
I Was A Cub Scout
Liss 
Aeone 
Liverpool 
Anathema
Atomic Kitten
The Bandits
BBMak
The Beatles
The Boo Radleys
Carcass
Cast
Crucial Three
The Crescent
The Christians
Christopher Maloney 
Cilla Black
Circa Waves
Dead or Alive
Echo and the Bunnymen
The Farm
Gerry and the Pacemakers
Hot Club De Paris
The Icicle Works
A Flock of Seagulls
Frankie Goes to Hollywood
Jemini 
The La's
Ladytron
Lawson
The Lightning Seeds
The Mighty Wah!
Multi Purpose Chemical
The Real Thing
Rebecca Ferguson
The Searchers
Sizer Barker
Sonia 
Space
The Stairs
The Stands
The Teardrop Explodes
The Zutons
Wave Machines
The Wombats
WSTR
London
Above & Beyond
Adam and the Ants
Add N to (X)
Adele
The Adverts
Akercocke
Alabama 3
The Alan Parsons Project
Alexandra Burke
Alien Sex Fiend
All Saints
AlunaGeorge
America
Amy Winehouse
Angel Witch
The Apostles
Archive
Athlete
Baby D
Babyshambles
Bad Company
Bad Manners
Bananarama
Barbarossa
Bark Psychosis
Basement Jaxx
Bastille
Bat For Lashes
Banco de Gaia
Bedrock
The Beloved
Benga
Ben Howard
Big Bang
The Big Pink
Billy Idol
Black Midi
Blancmange
Bleech
Bloc Party
Blonde Electra 
Blue
Blue Pearl 
Blues Incorporated
The Bluetones
Blur
Bôa
The Bolshoi
Bomb the Bass
Bombay Bicycle Club
Bonzo Dog Doo-Dah Band
Bow Wow Wow
Breton
Bronski Beat
Bryan Johnson
Emma Bunton 
Bush
Busted
Callender's Cableworks Band
Carter The Unstoppable Sex Machine
Chad & Jeremy
Chase & Status
Chris Farlowe and the Thunderbirds
The Chords
The Clash
To Kill A King
Classix Nouveaux
Clement Marfo & The Frontline
Client
Cliff Richard
The Clique
Cockney Rejects
Coldplay
Elvis Costello
Cream
The Creatures 
Crystal Fighters
Culture Club
Daisy Chainsaw
Damage
The Damned
Daniel Radcliffe 
Darkstar
Daughter
David Bowie
The Dave Clark Five
Days in december
Death in Vegas
Declan McKenna
Deep Purple
The Defiled
Delilah
Delta Heavy
Devil Sold His Soul
Dire Straits
Dirty Pretty Things
Dizzee Rascal
Django Django
DragonForce
The Dream Academy
Dry the River
Dot Rotten
Dumpy's Rusty Nuts
Dusty Springfield
Dua Lipa
Ebony Bones
Eclection
The Edge
Edison Lighthouse
The Echoes
Elastica
Eliza Doolittle
Ella Mai
Elvis Costello
Engineers
Erasure
Estelle
East 17
Eddy Grant
Eurythmics
Example
The Faces
The Fades
Faithless
The Feeling
Fightstar
Five
Fleetwood Mac
FLO
Florence + the Machine
The Flying Pickets
Foghat
Four of Diamonds 
Freeez
Furniture
Future Signal
Gary Numan
Gay Dad
Ghostpoet
Girls Aloud
Goldfrapp
Goldheart Assembly
Gold Panda
Gorgon City
Gorillaz
Go West
Gravity Noir
Groove Armada
Hadouken!
Haken
Hawkwind
Hear'Say 
Heaven's Basement
Hell Is for Heroes
The Hoosiers
Hot Chip
Hot Chocolate
The House of Love
The Hurt Process
Ikara Colt
Infadels
Iron Maiden
James Blake
James Blunt
Jamie T
Jamiroquai
Japan
Jazz Jamaica
Jess Glynne
Jessie J
Jessie Ware
The Jim Jones Revue
The Jimi Hendrix Experience
Johnny Panic
The Joker & The Thief
Jungle
Kano
Kate Nash
Katie Melua
Katy B
Ken Colyer 
Killing Joke
The King Blues
King Charles
King Crimson
King Krule
The Kinks
Kissing the Pink
Klaxons
KSI
La Roux
Labrinth
Led Zeppelin
Leona Lewis
The Libertines
Lily Allen
Little Mix
Lo Fidelity Allstars
London Grammar
Loveable Rogues
Love Affair
Lush
Lynsey de Paul 
The Maccabees
Madness
The Magic Numbers
Manfred Mann
Mark Ronson
McFly
Meat Beat Manifesto
The Members
The Merton Parkas
M.I.A.
Michael Kiwanuka
Mika
Million Dead
Modestep
Morcheeba
The Moths!
The Motors
Motörhead
Mount Kimbie
Mud
Mumford and Sons
Mystery Jets
My Vitriol
Nero
The New Seekers 
The Nice
Noah and the Whale
Noisettes
Nurse with Wound
Oh Wonder 
One Direction
The One Hundred
Only the Young 
The Others
The Outfield
P.C.T
Palma Violets
The Passions
Petrol Girls 
Pet Shop Boys
Phil Collins
Pink Floyd
Placebo
Plan B
The Pogues
The Police
The Pretenders
Procol Harum
Psapp
The Psychedelic Furs
Public Image Ltd.
Public Service Broadcasting
Pure Love
Pure Reason Revolution
PVT
Queen
The Raincoats
The Rakes
Razorlight
Regular Fries
The Rifles
Robin Scott
Rod Stewart
The Rolling Stones
Roxy Music
Rudimental
The Ruts
Sade
Saint Etienne
Sam Smith
Samantha Fox
The Saturdays
Savages
S Club 7
S Club 8
Scouting For Girls
Seal
Secret Affair
Seefeel
Senser
Sex Pistols
The Shadows 
Sham 69
Shola Ama
Siouxsie and the Banshees
Sisteray
Pixie Lott
Skinny Lister
The Skints
Skunk Anansie
Slash
Small Faces
Spandau Ballet
Spector
Spice Girls
Splashh
Squeeze
Status Quo
Stereolab
Stereo Kicks 
Stereo MC's
Skream
Stooshe
Stormzy
Strawbs
Suede
Sugababes
Supertramp
Sweet Dreams (1970s band)
Sweet Dreams (1980s band) 
Sweet
T. Rex
Talk Talk
The Tears
Tempa T
Ten Benson
The Temperance Movement
Test Icicles
Theatre of Hate
The The
Thompson Twins
Tinie Tempah
Tomorrow
Tom Vek
Transvision Vamp 
Tribes
Tubeway Army
Ugly As Sin
U.K. Subs
UFO
Ultravox
Underworld
Union J 
UNKLE
Uriah Heep
The Vaccines
The Vamps
Vaughan King
Veronica Falls
Visage
Voice of the Beehive
Vondelpark
Wargasm 
White Lies
Whitesnake
The Wanted
The Who
Wiley
Wilkinson
Wire
The Wiseguys
Wolf Alice
Wretch 32
The xx
The Yardbirds
Years & Years
Yes
Young Guns
Zero 7
21 Savage
Lowestoft
Lil' Chris 
The Darkness
Hot Leg
Luton
Jethro Tull
Paul Young 
Lymington
Adamski
Birdy
Macclesfield
Ian Curtis
John Mayall
The Virginmarys
Malvern
Cher Lloyd
Manchester
10cc
The 1975
52nd Street
808 State
A Guy Called Gerald
A II Z
A Certain Ratio
Amplifier
Audioweb
Autechre
Ed Banger and The Nosebleeds
Barclay James Harvest
Beecher
Bee Gees
Big Flame
Billy Ruffian
Black Grape
Blak Twang
Blue Orchids
Bugzy Malone
Brassy
Buzzcocks
Blossoms
The Chameleons
The Chemical Brothers
Cleopatra
The Clint Boon Experience
Cohesion
Courteeners
Crispy Ambulance
Daley
Delphic
Doves
Dutch Uncles
The Durutti Column
Easterhouse
Elbow
Electronic
Everything Everything
The Fall
Fingathing
Flip & Fill 
Freddie and the Dreamers
Freeloaders
Future Sound of London
Godley & Creme
Happy Mondays
Haven
Herman's Hermits
Tom Hingley and the Lovers
The Hollies
Hurts
I Am Kloot
Inspiral Carpets
James
Joy Division
Kinesis
King of the Slums
Lamb
The Longcut
Liam Gallagher
Longview
Love City Groove 
Ludus
Luxuria
M People
Magazine
Man From Delmonte
Marconi Union
John Mayall & the Bluesbreakers
Mazes
The Mindbenders
Mint Royale
Misha B 
Molly Half Head
Monaco
Morrissey
The Mothmen
N-Trance
New Hope Club 
New Order
Nine Black Alps
Noel Gallagher's High Flying Birds
Northside
Oasis
Oceansize
Omerta
The Other Two
Pale Waves
Paris Angels
The Passage
Puressence
Quando Quango
Rae & Christian
The Railway Children
Ruthless Rap Assassins
Sad Café
The Seahorses
Simply Red
Slaughter & The Dogs
The Slow Show
The Smirks
The Smiths
Sonic Boom Six
Space Monkeys
Spookey
Starsailor
Sub Sub
The Stone Roses
Sweet Sensation
Swing Out Sister
Take That
Theatre of Hate
The Ting Tings
Van der Graaf Generator
The Verve
The Waltones
The Whip
World of Twist
Maidenhead
Wings of Pegasus
Matlock
Karma Kid
Rhythm Plate
Diagrams
The Accidental
Ben Ottewell
Middlesbrough
Chris Rea
Dartz!
The Axis of Perdition
James Arthur
Space Raiders
Milton Keynes
Fellsilent
Hacktivist
TesseracT
Moreton
Humble Pie
Nantwich
Blitz Kids
Newcastle upon Tyne
The Animals
Cheryl Cole
Dire Straits
Dubstar
Eric Burdon
Lighthouse Family
Maxïmo Park
Jimmy Nail
Pet Shop Boys
Raven
Sakima
Venom
The Wildhearts
YFriday
yourcodenameis:milo
Zoviet France
Newcastle-Under-Lyme
Dan Croll
Newton-le-Willows
Rick Astley
North London 
Andy Abraham
North Shields
Sam Fender
Norwich
Cathy Dennis
Let's Eat Grandma 
Sigala
Northampton
Alan Walker
Bauhaus
The Departure
Maps
Jealous
Slowthai
Northwich
The Charlatans
Nottingham
Area 11
Consumed
Earthtone9
Fudge Tunnel
Heck
Ice MC
Imaani 
Iron Monkey
Jake Bugg
Paper Lace
Pitchshifter
Sabbat
Skyclad
Sleaford Mods 
Stereo MC's
Ten Years After
Tindersticks
Curtis Whitefinger
Nuneaton
Fresh Maggots
Nunthorpe 
Amelia Lily
Oxford
Bellowhead
Foals
Glass Animals
Hugh Laurie 
Ride
Stornoway
Supergrass
Swervedriver
Talulah Gosh
Totally Enormous Extinct Dinosaurs
Winnebago Deal
Youthmovie Soundtrack Strategies
Peterborough
The Wytches 
Pinner
Elton John
Plaistow 
Jade Ewen
Poringland 
Ronan Parke
Portsmouth
The Cranes
Simon Dupree & The Big Sound
Gentle Giant
Poulton-le-Fylde
Skrewdriver
Preston
Screams of Cold Winter
Reading
The Amazons
The Arusha Accord
Chapterhouse
The Cooper Temple Clause
Exit Ten
A Genuine Freakshow
Slowdive
Sylosis
Redbridge 
Frances Ruffelle 
Redditch
The Cravats
The Very Things
Romford
Billy Ocean 
Purple Hearts
Rugby
James Morrison
Lavondyss
Spacemen 3
Spiritualized
Salisbury
Dave Dee, Dozy, Beaky, Mick & Tich
Scunthorpe 
Jake Quickenden
Sheffield
65daysofstatic
ABC
A.C. Temple
All Seeing I
Arctic Monkeys
Artery
Babybird
Bal-Sagoth
Black Spiders
Blameless
Bring Me the Horizon
Bromheads Jacket
Cabaret Voltaire
The Comsat Angels
The Crookes
Def Leppard
Drenge
Fat Truckers
Graham Fellows 
Heaven 17
Hiem
Hoggboy
The Human League
I Monster
In the Nursery
Joe Cocker 
Kings Have Long Arms
The Last Shadow Puppets
LFO
Lindsay Dracass 
Little Man Tate 
Living in a Box
The Long Blondes
Longpigs
The Lovers
Milburn
Moloko
Monkey Swallows the Universe
Pink Grease
Pulp
Reverend and The Makers
Richard Hawley 
Rolo Tomassi
Slow Club
Smokers Die Younger
While She Sleeps
Shoreditch 
Matt Monro
Somerset 
Ozric Tentacles 
The Wurzels
Southampton
Band of Skulls
Bury Tomorrow
Creeper
Delays
Foxes
Moss
Southend
The Hamsters
The Horrors
Get Cape. Wear Cape. Fly
Nothing But Thieves
Southport
Gomez
South Shields
Angelic Upstarts
Stafford
Bizarre Inc
Staines
HARD-FI
St Albans
Dark Stares
Enter Shikari
Friendly Fires
Trash Boat
Your Demise
Stanford-le-Hope
Dan Le Sac Vs Scroobius Pip
Start Hill
Charli XCX
Stevenage
Fields of the Nephilim
St Helens
The Lancashire Hotpots
Stockport 
Blossoms
Daz Sampson 
Stoke-on-Trent
D Mob
Discharge
Joe and Jake 
Motörhead
Robbie Williams
Slash
Stourbridge
Diamond Head
Ned's Atomic Dustbin
Pop Will Eat Itself
Witchfinder General
The Wonder Stuff
Streetly 
Connie Talbot 
Suffolk
A
Sunderland
Frankie & The Heartstrings
The Futureheads
Field Music
Kenickie
Leatherface
Surrey
Blind Faith
Canterbury
Disclosure
Eric Clapton
Fatboy Slim
Hundred Reasons
Los
Lucy Rose
Newton Faulkner 
Reuben
Scarlett Lee 
The Stranglers
You Me at Six
Sussex
Chloe Jasmine 
The Feeling
Swindon
The Dead Lay Waiting
XTC
Tavistock
The Rumblestrips
Teddington 
Keira Knightley 
Teignmouth
Muse
Telford
The Sunshine Underground
Tetney
Ella Henderson
Tewkesbury
Spunge
Thurrock 
Louisa Johnson 
Torquay
Wishbone Ash
Tyne And Wear
Little Comets
Walthamstow 
Fleur East 
Wakefield
Be Bop Deluxe
The Cribs
The Research
Skint & Demoralised
Watford
Gallows
Geri Halliwell
Naughty Boy
Rak-Su 
Sikth
Wednesbury
Joanne Shaw Taylor
Wellington (Salop)
T'Pau
Weybridge
Nashville Teens
You Me At Six
Weymouth
Whitley Bay
Tygers of Pan Tang
Widnes
Melanie C
Wigan
The Verve
Wirral
Orchestral Manoeuvres in the Dark
Witham 
Olly Murs
Woking
Jentina
The Jam
Wolverhampton
Babylon Zoo
Slade
Liam Payne
S-X
Worcester
Peace
Scarlet Carmina
Worthing
The Ordinary Boys
York
Asking Alexandria
John Barry
Chris Helme
The Batfish Boys
The Redskins
Shed Seven
The Seahorses
The Smoke
Glamour of the Kill
Elliot Minor
RSJ
Mostly Autumn

References

English bands
Bihar